12 Miles of Bad Road is a television show originally created for HBO centered on a Texas matriarch who must reconcile her booming real estate business and immense wealth with the day-to-day struggles of her dysfunctional family life.

Cast
The cast includes:

Production
12 Miles of Bad Road was created by writer Linda Bloodworth-Thomason, creator of the television hits Designing Women, Hearts Afire, and Evening Shade. It was produced by Bloodworth-Thomason and Harry Thomason's Mozark Productions,  as well as HBO. The pilot was shot in 2007.  Set in Dallas, but shot in Los Angeles, the characters live in the wealthy north Dallas neighborhood of Preston Hollow.

Ten episodes of the series were ordered by HBO, but because of the 2007–2008 Writers Guild of America strike, only six episodes were shot. On March 17, 2008, HBO announced that it was not planning to air the show and the creators were shopping the episodes around to other networks.

The title is a lyric from the song "Crush with Eyeliner" from the 1995 R.E.M. album Monster, which was itself a reference to the hit song "Forty Miles of Bad Road" by Duane Eddy.

Critical reception

Newsweek called it "a scabrously funny satire of real-estate magnates in Dubya's Texas".

The Los Angeles Times reported that after HBO passed on the show, "despite its price and pedigree" of prestigious actors and producers, the critics got a look:

From the June 2008 issue of Texas Monthly:

On the producers' decision to send the un-aired episodes to critics, the Toronto Star wrote:

Episodes
 - "Pilot"
 - "The Dirty White Girl"
 - "Tremors"
 - "Collateral Verbiage"
 - "Texas Stadium"
 - "Moon-shadow"

References

External links

Television shows set in Dallas
Unaired television shows
English-language television shows
Television series created by Linda Bloodworth-Thomason